Uliești is a commune in Dâmbovița County, Muntenia, Romania with a population of 4,455 people. It is composed of eight villages: Croitori, Hanu lui Pală, Jugureni, Mănăstioara, Olteni, Ragu, Stavropolia and Uliești. 

The commune lies among an important but non highway route (61) leading to and from Găești. To its northeast runs the river Argeș. Through the heart of the commune runs the river Neajlov.

Natives
 Constantin Niculae

References

Communes in Dâmbovița County
Localities in Muntenia